Graduate College may refer to:

Princeton University Graduate College
Graduate College, Lancaster
Union Graduate College
UNLV Graduate College
Nathan Weiss Graduate College